The Chicagoland Collegiate Athletic Conference (CCAC) is a college athletic conference affiliated with the National Association of Intercollegiate Athletics (NAIA).  Its 14 members are located in the Midwestern United States.  In many sports, the conference champion qualifies directly for national competition.

The CCAC sanctions play in eight men's and eight women's sports.  Men's sports include soccer, cross country, basketball, track and field, tennis, baseball, golf, and volleyball; while women's sports include soccer, volleyball, cross country, track and field, basketball, tennis, golf, and softball.

In all sports, it sanctions regular season league play as well as a post-season tournament.

Member schools

Current members
The CCAC currently has 14 full members, all but three are private schools:

Notes

Affiliate members
The CCAC currently has one affiliate member, which is also a private school:

Former members
The CCAC has 18 former full members, all but three are private schools:

Notes

References

External links